The Men's Macau Open 2012 is the men's edition of the 2012 Macau Open (squash), which is a tournament of the PSA World Tour event International (Prize money: $50,000). The event took place in Macau in China from 18 to 21 October. Karim Darwish won his first Macau Open trophy, beating Mohamed El Shorbagy in the final.

Prize money and ranking points
For 2012, the prize purse was $50,000. The prize money and points breakdown is as follows:

Seeds

Draw and results

See also
PSA World Tour 2012
Macau Open (squash)

References

External links
PSA Macau Open 2012 website
Squashinfo Macau Open 2012 page

Squash tournaments in Macau
Macau Open
Macau Open (squash)